Ashwini Roy Sarkar is a Bharatiya Janata Party politician from Assam. He has been elected in Assam Legislative Assembly election in 2016 from Golakganj constituency.

References 

Living people
Bharatiya Janata Party politicians from Assam
People from Dhubri district
Assam MLAs 2016–2021
Year of birth missing (living people)